Caneadea is a town in Allegany County, New York, United States. The population was 2,238 at the 2020 census.

The name is of Seneca language origin and means "where the heavens rest on earth." The Seneca are the dominant Iroquoian tribe in this western part of their territory and are known as the "gatekeepers"; they are one of the Five Nations of the Haudenonsaunee, or Iroquois League.

The town is in the northwest quadrant of the county.

History 
Caneadea was named after the upper, or old Seneca village located on a bluff above the east side of the Genesee River opposite the site of present-day Houghton. They are one of the original Five Nations of the Iroquois League or Haudenosaunee, and dominated the western area of the large territory. Sometime in the latter half of the 18th century, the Seneca built a square log council house here with the help of British troops from Fort Niagara. Usually their council houses were in the form of longhouses.

The region was first settled by European Americans around 1800, after most of the Seneca had left for Canada, with a remnant forced to a reservation. Their bands had allied with the British during the American Revolutionary War and, after defeat, it had ceded all its territory east of the Mississippi River to the new United States, without consulting with its allies.

The Town of Caneadea was founded in 1808 from part of the town of Angelica. However, the town was reduced as the population increased and other towns were formed from this territory in the county: Friendship (1815), Rushford (1816), and Belfast (1824 and 1831). The Caneadea Reservation of the Seneca tribe was once located in the town, but they sold off their claims in 1825 under pressure from white speculators.

The former Genesee Valley Canal once passed through the town.

The Caneadea Bridge was listed on the National Register of Historic Places in 1998.

Geography

The town developed along the Genesee River, an important and historic Western New York river, which had also been valued by the Seneca. Rushford Lake is partly at the town's west line, and Caneadea Creek is an important stream in the town.

New York State Route 19 passes through the town (north-south) and intersects New York State Route 243 north of Canaeadea village.

Demographics

As of the census of 2000, there were 2,694 people, 650 households, and 436 families residing in the town.  The population density was 75.8 people per square mile (29.3/km2).  There were 1,098 housing units at an average density of 30.9 per square mile (11.9/km2).  The racial makeup of the town was 96.33% White, 1.00% African American, 0.15% Native American, 0.97% Asian, 0.56% from other races, and 1.00% from two or more races. Hispanic or Latino of any race were 2.26% of the population.

There were 650 households, out of which 33.7% had children under the age of 18 living with them, 56.5% were married couples living together, 7.1% had a female householder with no husband present, and 32.9% were non-families. 25.2% of all households were made up of individuals, and 8.3% had someone living alone who was 65 years of age or older.  The average household size was 2.72 and the average family size was 3.20.

In the town, the population was spread out, with 18.4% under the age of 18, 40.9% from 18 to 24, 16.1% from 25 to 44, 13.4% from 45 to 64, and 11.1% who were 65 years of age or older.  The median age was 22 years. For every 100 females, there were 80.9 males.  For every 100 females age 18 and over, there were 75.5 males.

The median income for a household in the town was $31,065, and the median income for a family was $39,667. Males had a median income of $29,643 versus $21,563 for females. The per capita income for the town was $10,010.  About 12.7% of families and 21.3% of the population were below the poverty line, including 19.8% of those under age 18 and 1.0% of those age 65 or over.

Notable people
Lady Baldwin, 19th-century baseball pitcher
William Muldoon, wrestler and first New York State Athletic Commissioner

Communities and locations in Caneadea 
Caneadea – The hamlet of Caneadea is located on Route 19 by the Genesee River in the western part of the town.
Genesee River – A river that flows northward through the town.
Houghton – The hamlet of Houghton is the site of Houghton College. Route 19 passes the hamlet, located near the northern town line, adjacent to the Genesee River.
Oramel – A hamlet on Route 19, south of the hamlet of Canadea and near the Genesee River in the south part of the town. Oramel was incorporated as a village in 1856, but later abandoned this status; its post office (ZIP Code 14765) operated from 1850 to 1968.
Rushford Lake – A small lake partly inside the western part of the town.

References

External links
 Town of Caneadea official website
  Brief history note

New York (state) populated places on the Genesee River
Towns in Allegany County, New York
1808 establishments in New York (state)